Pensacola City Hall is located at 222 West Main Street in Pensacola, Florida, and houses the majority of the offices for the City of Pensacola government. The building faces Pensacola Bay and suffered heavy damage from Hurricane Ivan in 2004, reopening in 2006 after an extensive remodeling process. Meetings of the Pensacola City Council are held in the Council Chambers on the first floor.

See also

Community Maritime Park

References

Buildings and structures in Pensacola, Florida
City and town halls in Florida
1986 establishments in Florida